The Model 39 "Eihandgranate", M39 or Eierhandgranate 39 ("egg hand grenade") was a German fragmentation hand grenade introduced in 1939 and produced until the end of World War II.

Description 
The Eihandgranate were issued to the Fallschirmjäger from early till the end of the war. The grenade used the same fuse assembly (the BZE 39) as the Model 43 Stielhandgranate ("Stick Grenade"), which was screwed into the top of the sheet-metal body.

To activate, the dome-shaped cap was unscrewed and pulled with a coiled pull-cord that is pulled before throwing. The color of the cap indicated the burning time of the type of fuze fitted. Typically, a delay of around four seconds was used. It could also be used in place of the bottom side screw cap on the "Stielhandgranate" stick grenades.

If it was to be used as a fixed booby-trap then an instantaneous or one-second fuse would be fitted. Sometimes, this style of grenade would be discarded in plain view for the enemy to use, particularly on the Eastern Front and in the Western Front. They were used in France as part of Erwin Rommel's asparagus. Obstacles, such as wooden poles, were used to hinder airborne landings, which could tear the wings of gliders and also kill the soldiers inside as these poles were connected with wires to either these grenades or S-mines (Bouncing Betty) against paratroopers. Later in Italy they would also be used as booby traps to slow down Allied advances on the Italian peninsula, in ambushes or in street fighting and as traps for the Italian Partisans when they raided German supplies and weapon caches. Another type of trap was to wire a short-fuse grenade to a door-frame in an abandoned building with the pull-cord attached to the door. When the door was breached by opposing troops the grenade would detonate right next to the enemy. 

The offensive (high explosive) version of the grenade used a small Donarit filling which was considered extremely ineffective in comparison to the standard stick grenade models: large amounts of these grenades would be thrown in a short amount of time or at once for the desired effect.

The defensive (fragmentation) version of the grenade had a fragmentation sleeve wrapped around the exterior of the grenade, which would turn into high speed shrapnel when the grenade exploded giving it a longer range and greater damage ability to the enemy.

Fuse cap color-codes 

 Red - 1 second delay (for coloured smoke, but also booby-trap)
 Blue - 4.5 second (standard issue)
 Yellow - 7.5 seconds (used on the Hafthohlladung 3 - magnetic shaped charge)
 Grey - No delay (used for demolitions work or as booby-trap.)

See also
Model 24 grenade
Model 43 grenade

References

External links
German Grenades of Wo piqka e nanes
German Hand & Rifle Grenades

Literature 
 Terry Gander, Peter Chamberlain: Encyclopedia of German Weapons 1939–1945. 2nd Release, Special edition. Motorbuchverlag, Stuttgart 2006, .
 D. Mitev, Bulgarian and German hand grenades – history, development, contemporary state, Vol. 1, 216 pages, Sofia, 2008

World War II infantry weapons of Germany
Hand grenades of Germany
Military equipment introduced in the 1930s